Man of the World is a studio album by Greek singer Demis Roussos, released in 1980 on Mercury Records.

Commercial performance 
The album reached no. 36 in the Netherlands.

Track listing 
All tracks produced by David Mackay for the Round Record Co. Ltd.

Italian version

Spanish version Hombre del mundo (Man of the World)

Charts

References

External links 
 Demis Roussos – Man of the World at Discogs

1980 albums
Demis Roussos albums
Mercury Records albums
Albums produced by David Mackay (producer)